By-elections for Chomutov and Přerov District Senate seats were held in 2017. Election in Chomutov was held on 13 and 14 April while in Přerov on 27-28 April.

Chomutov
Communist Václav Homolka has won the election in Chomutov. He defeated Jan Řehák. This election was held when incumbent stepped down due to health matters.

Přerov
Přerov election was a battle between Social Democrat Jiří Latjtoch and Communist Josef Nekl. Lajtoch was supported by right wing parties in the second round. Lajtoch narrowly won the election.

References

Senate by-elections
Czech Senate by-elections
2007